Kaisi Teri Khudgarzi is a Pakistani television drama series produced by Abdullah Seja under the banner of iDream Entertainment. It features Dur-e-Fishan Saleem, Danish Taimoor, Nauman Ijaz, and Atiqa Odho in leading roles with Laila Wasti, Shahood Alvi, Hammad Shoaib, and Zainab Qayyum in supporting roles. The series originally aired on ARY Digital starting from 11 May 2022, and ending on 14 December 2022.

Plot

Mehak (Dur-e-Fishan Saleem) is a young woman living a peaceful life with her father Akram (Shahood Alvi), her mother Naheed (Laila Wasti), and her younger sister Nida (Laiba Khan). Mehak is engaged to her cousin Ahsan (Hammad Shoaib), but Ahsan's mother Andaleep (Zainab Qayyum) doesn't approve of Mehak, while Ahsan's father Rehan does approve of her. One day, Akram finds a young rich, arrogant man harassing someone on the road, and when he goes to confront this man, the man points a gun at Akram. This man turns out to be Shamsher (Danish Taimoor). Mehak and Rehan plead with him and bring Akram back to the car, but Shamsher sees Mehak, and immediately falls in love with her.

Once Shamsher finds out who Mehak is and where she lives, he tries multiple evil ways to get Mehak to marry him, including getting Akram arrested for a while and kidnapping Ahsan on their wedding day. When Mehak finally gives in and agrees to marry Shamsher to save her the lives of her loved ones, he is thrilled and promises to love Mehak and protect her till his last breath.  Shamsher's father Dilawar (Nauman Ijaz) is a very rich and arrogant man, who is also extremely powerful and influential, and he doesn't approve of Mehak since she is poor, and he believes is really after Shamsher's wealth. Shamsher's mother Mehwish (Atiqa Odho) and his brother Dara (Tipu Sharif) both agree to the alliance because they are helpless in front of Shamsher. Dara's wife Farwa (Ayesha Toor) hates Mehak because Farwa's sister Sofia (Shehzeen Rahat) wants to marry Shamsher. Also, because Mehak disrespected her on one occasion.

Dilawar then hires a hitman, Sheru (Adnan Shah Tipu) to kill Mehak on her and Shamsher's wedding day. Sheru succeeds in burning Mehak's car with her trapped inside. Believing that Mehak is dead, Shamsher and Mehak's family are heartbroken. But, somehow Mehak manages to survive. When Akram finds Mehak alive and well, he sends her to Multan to an old friends place as he does not want Shamsher to find out, but Sheru sees her, much to his shock. Heartbroken by Mehak’s sudden supposed demise and enraged by Shamsher’s past actions, Ahsan goes and shoots Shamsher. Shamsher is in critical condition at the hospital. Dilawar gets Ahsan and all the men in Mehak's family arrested as punishment. Shamsher's mother- who is aware of the role her husband had to play in Mehak's death- feels remorseful and goes to meet Mehak's mother and seek her forgiveness for the atrocities committed by her son. Mahek's mother (who just discovered that her daughter is alive) grants forgiveness to Shamsher solely on the condition that he will stay as far away from their family as possible. Shamsher's mother agrees and leaves. On the way home, she gets her call from her husband that Shamsher has regained consciousness. 

After he recovers, Shamsher is still depressed and miserable without his one true love, so his family plan to send him abroad for a while. On his way to the airport, Shamsher suddenly changes his mind and asks his friend to drive him to the nearest train station so he can completely vanish for some time and try to find peace on his own.
He gets on the train to Multan and when he reaches his destination, he is greeted by Sheru. Sheru has been sent by Dilawar to keep an eye on Shamsher and keep him out of trouble.
In a twisted turn of events, Shamsher and Sheru run into Mehak at the Mazaar. Shamsher feels a whirlwind of emotions as he is thrilled to find Mehak alive, but also shocked, confused and angary at her betrayal. Sheru then goes on the run from Dilawar. Shamsher flies Mehak's family in from Karachi and they marry in a private ceremony. 
Shamsher and Mehak come home, and Shamsher's family is astonished to see Mehak alive and well. None more than Dilawar who is infuriated by this alliance.

Dilawar starts searching for Sheru, and when Sheru is found, he confesses to Dara that Dilawar told him to kill Mehak, which Shamsher and Mehak overhear. Shamsher confronts his father and leaves his home with Mehak, forever. Dilawar freezes all of Shamsher's bank accounts and credit cards, making Shamsher poor. Shamsher then finds a job as a salesman, while Mehak finds a job at an IT company. Mehwish then gets sick and yearns to see her son one last time before she dies. However, Dilawar, being hurt by Shamsher abandoning him for a girl, refuses. Mehwish then dies and Dilawar is heartbroken. He holds Shamsher responsible for his wife's death as she passed yearning for him to come back home. He ridicules Shamsher and kicks him out  at the funeral. Ahsan then decides to marry Nida to redeem himself for rejecting Mehak when she needed him most. Dara constantly tries to talk some sense into his father as he hates watching his brother suffer and wants to make amends with him. Shamsher and Mehak began to grow close. Sheru is then called by Dilawar to kill Mehak, but Sheru doesn't kill her, as he is a changed man after losing his son. He instead, seeks her and Shamsher’s forgiveness. Shamsher gives Sheru a gun for protection, but later on, Shamsher finds Sheru dead. Shamsher then confronts Dilawar to stay away from him and Mehak or face legal action.

Ahsan gets a job at the same place where Mehak works. Ahsan and Nida start off rough on their married life but they later accept each. Mehak, after seeing how much Shamsher has changed and how much he cares for her, starts to develop feelings for him. Mehak is then revealed to be pregnant, but Dilawar hires another person to kill Mehak. After Shamsher and Mehak leave the hospital, Shamsher sees someone from far away pointing a gun at Mehak. Shamsher comes in front of her and takes the bullet. Dara finds out about this, and tells Dilawar that the people he sent to kill Mehak shot Shamsher instead, and that he is critical. This leaves Dilawar devastated as he fears losing his son and that too because of his own stupidity and pride.

At the hospital, Mehak yells at Dilawar, and breaks the news to him about her pregnancy, which leaves him feeling even more guilt-ridden. Shamsher then regains consciousness and professes his love to Mehak as does she for the first time. And right at that moment, Shamsher takes his final breath.  Dilawar and Mehak are both crushed. There is a shift to Nawab mansion 2 months after Shamsher's death. Dilawar then reminisces about all his past actions and recalls his wife's and son's warnings to him about potentially losing everything and everyone because of his pride. So, a completely shattered and guilt-ridden Dilawar, unable to process his sons loss, commits suicide, after having publicly confessed to all his sinister crimes. Dara is heartbroken as he has lost everyone he loves in a span of a few months.
 
Sofia then comes and apologizes to Mehak for everything she has done to her and Shamsher. Dilawar’s lawyer then tells Mehak and Akram that Dilawar left 50% of his entire wealth to Mehak, but Mehak donates all of it. 

There is a 3 year time jump, Mehak is celebrating the 2nd birthday of her son named after his father, Shamsher, then Mehak turns to a portrait of her husband Shamsher, and she talks about how she can never forget about what he did to her before their marriage and how she tries to not make her son become aggressive and angry like his father, but Mehak also says that she will always love Shamsher and will always keep him alive in her memories.

Cast
 Dur-e-Fishan Saleem as Mehak Shamsher née Akram, Shamsher's wife Akram & Naheed's oldest daughter, Nida's sister
 Danish Taimoor as Nawabzaada Shamsher Dilawar, Mehak's husband, Dilawar & Mehwish's youngest son, Dara's younger brother (Dead)
 Nauman Ijaz as Nawab Dilawar, Shamsher and Dara’s father, Mehwish’s husband (Dead)
 Atiqa Odho as Mehwish, Shamsher and Dara’s mother, Dilawar’s wife (Dead)
 Laila Wasti as Naheed, Mehak's Mother
 Shahood Alvi as Akram, Mehak's Father
 Hammad Shoaib as Ahsan, Andaleeb's son, Mehak's ex-fiancé, Nida's Husband
 Zainab Qayyum as Andaleeb, Ahsan's mother
 Laiba Khan as Nida, Akram and Naheed’s younger daughter, Mehak's sister, Ahsan's wife
 Adnan Shah Tipu as Sheru, Dilawar’s servant (Dead) 
 Tipu Sharif as Dara, Dilawar and Mehwish’s oldest son, Shamsher’s older brother, Farwa’s husband
DJ Fluke
 Ayesha Toor as Farwa, Dara’s wife, Sofia’s oldest sister
 Shehzeen Rahat as Sofia, Farwa’s youngest sister
 Emmad Butt as Shahmeer, Shamsher’s friend

Production
The show was earlier titled Ishq-e-Junoon. The first and second teasers were released on 16 April 2022.

Reception

Critical reception 
Before the series premiere, dawn.com expressed disappointment over the teasers by writing, "Despite the mess that was Ishq Hai, producers are rehashing the tiresome trope of obsessive, violent love again."

On its premiere, the series received criticism and negative reviews due to the romanticised portrayal of obsession and toxic masculinity. While reviewing the first episode negatively, a reviewer from The News International described the show as, "another run-of-the-mill play with more style than substance."

Viewership 
In September 2022, Daily Pakistan reported Kaisi Teri Khudgarzi was one of the most-watched shows in Pakistan and all over the world

References

Pakistani television series
2022 Pakistani television series debuts
2022 Pakistani television series endings